The 1936 Temple Owls football team was an American football team that represented Temple University as an independent during the 1936 college football season. In its fourth season under head coach Pop Warner, the team compiled a 6–3–2 record and outscored opponents by a total of 117 to 66. The team played its home games at Temple Stadium in Philadelphia.

Schedule

References

Temple
Temple Owls football seasons
Temple Owls football